Bob Van Ronkel is an American producer, businessman and president of Doors to Hollywood, a company that over the last 20 years has brought more than 130 high-profile Hollywood actors, directors, producers, athletes, models and bands to Russia, Kazakhstan, Uzbekistan and other CIS countries to meet presidents, oligarchs, attend film festivals, perform concerts, speak at forums and appear in films and at special events. He has also produced 9 films, 2 television series and numerous live events.

Early life
Van Ronkel was born in Orange, California as Robert William Fucci. His mother, Joy Wurgaft, was one of the original "Little Rascals."

After graduating Beverly Hills High School, Van Ronkel skipped college and began working. During the late ‘70s, ‘80s and ‘90s, he worked in many different businesses, including auto detailing, clothes manufacturing (owner of Wings Jeans, Fury Sportswear and Clothes Encounters), nutritional supplement distribution, real estate sales (Fred Sands), the restaurant business (owner “435 North”), and eventually film production. Growing up in and around Beverly Hills and being very sociable, he built a huge network of wealthy and powerful friends.

Career
1978. Opened cloths manufacturing company Wings Jeans in Los Angeles.

1980. Opened cloths manufacturing company Fury Sportswear in New York.

1982. Opened Clothes Encounters in Newport Beach.

1985. Started selling real estate for Fred Sands Realtors in Beverly Hills.

1990. Open his restaurant “435 North” on Beverly Drive in Beverly Hills.

1992. Sold “435 North”.

1992–1997. Continued to sell real estate in and around Beverly Hills.

1997. Formed “Sherman-Van Ronkel Productions”.

1998. Produced his first film, The Tic Code, starring Gregory Hines.

1999. Produced his second film, “Scream of the Mummy.”

2000. Became a consultant to the Moscow International Film Festival.

In early 1998, Van Ronkel's life completely changed when he was introduced to a Russian producer in Los Angeles who asked if he could help sell his Russian produced, English-language film in the US and Europe called Sacred Cargo.

After much success selling the film, the Russian producer brought Van Ronkel an invitation from the Mayor of Moscow, Yury Luzhkov, asking if he could convince a Hollywood studio to come to Russia and with the Moscow government as a partner, build multiplex cinemas throughout the country.  Within a month Van Ronkel met with senior executives at Warner Bros Studio, Jim Miller and Millard Ochs and arranged his first trip to Russia with Millard, Sasha Shapiro and Chris Adelman, to meet the Russian government.

Following their second trip to Moscow in 1998, Van Ronkel received a call from the General Director of the Moscow International Film Festival, Renat Davletyarov, asking if he could bring a Hollywood star to their film festival in early 1999.

Having just produced his first film and knowing very few people in the entertainment industry, one of the few well known actor friends Van Ronkel had was Martin Landau, who agreed to attend the film festival with Van Ronkel.

1999. After successfully bringing Landau to the festival and Warner Bros to meet the Russian government, Van Ronkel was hired by the Moscow International Film Festival as its U.S. consultant.

2000. At a time when Americans were wary of traveling to Russia, after months of networking and many phone calls to his VIP friends, Van Ronkel was able to bring to the Moscow International Film Festival the president of Paramount Pictures, Sherry Lansing, director William Friedkin, and producers Jay Firestone and Peter Hoffman. He also persuaded E-TV to attend and cover the festival.

2001. He was re-hired as consultant to the Moscow International Film Festival and using his strong network of contacts, convinced actors Jack Nicholson, Sean Penn, Lara Flynn Boyle, Woody Harrelson, Peta Wilson and Sammo Hung to attend. The same month, new friend Jim Carrey and his business manager John Rigney came to Moscow and spent five days there with Van Ronkel.

After another successful trip and so many people speaking about Van Ronkel bringing so many Hollywood stars to Russia, many journalists began to interview and write about him.

Shortly after the festival, Van Ronkel was contacted by a Russian/American company called Matador Media and asked if he could bring two well-known celebrities to Moscow to help promote the opening of its new offices in Los Angeles. Within 30 days, Van Ronkel arranged for John Malkovich and Dolph Lundgren to fly to Moscow with him to promote Matador Media. With this, Doors to Hollywood was founded.

2002. Sixty days later, Van Ronkel was hired to help throw a seven-day, $7,000,000 birthday party in Jamaica for a Russian oligarch turning 30. They booked the entire Grand Lido Braco Resort and during the week brought the bands Kiss, Nazareth, The Scorpions, and Sugar Ray to perform for the 150 guests.

A short time later Van Ronkel was hired by the Kinotavr Film Festival in Sochi, Russia to bring two actors and took Eric Roberts and Dolph Lundgren to attend the opening and closing of the festival.

Just after that Van Ronkel was hired to help throw a Russian oligarch's 34th birthday party in Cannes, France, and had a $3,000,000 budget for the three day party. The guests he brought were Val Kilmer, James Caan, Billy Zane, Rutger Hauer, Faye Dunaway, Chris Kirkpatrick, Ralf Moeller, Ah-Ha and the Gypsy Kings.

By the end of 2002 and after having made so many new wealthy and powerful Russian friends, Van Ronkel decided to move to Moscow and opened “Doors to Hollywood” there.

2003. With a $1,000,000 budget from MDM Bank for the 300 year Anniversary of the city of St. Petersburg, Russia, he organized and produced the Hiro Yamagata-MDM Bank laser exhibition over the Neva River, which 1,300,000 people attended.

In the same year, Van Ronkel became such a well-known name in the Russian media and elite circles, he began to get many calls asking him to bring actors and bands to film festivals, private parties, forums, television shows and special events in Russia and former CIS countries.

The next 14 years. Van Ronkel produced films and events and brought over 130 celebrities to Russia, Kazakhstan and the Ukraine. In December 2010, he arranged a visit for Kevin Costner and his band Modern West to perform at a private charity event for President Vladimir Putin in St. Petersburg.

In 2013 Van Ronkel was contacted by executives at NBC-Universal and asked if he could help them in Moscow, while they were there organizing the 2013 Miss Universe pageant. There he met president to be, Donald Trump and entertained celebrity guests and friends Steven Tyler and producers Allen Shapiro and Peter Guber.

In 2016 Van Ronkel was hired to bring Steven Seagal to perform at a charity event in Moscow and then meet with President Vladimir Putin after.  He also brought Kevin Costner and Modern West to perform at the same event.

During the 15 years Van Ronkel lived in Russia, he did over 300 different deals including opening the Grand Havana Room cigar club in Moscow, Doors to Hollywood Acting Academy, brought actors and bands such as, Katy Perry, Kanye West, 30 Seconds to Mars, Mariah Carey, Richard Gere, Jim Carrey, Kevin Costner and Modern West, Arnold Schwarzenegger, Antonio Banderas, Nicolas Cage, Flo Rida, Milla Jovovich, Sigourney Weaver, Owen Wilson, Steven Seagal, Val Kilmer, Hilary Swank, Bryan Ferry, Jon Voight, Billy Zane, Jean-Claude Van Damme, Mickey Rourke,[2]  Irina Shayk, A-HA, Back Street Boys, Tom Jones, Paul Anka, John Cusack, Pamela Anderson, Dolph Lundgren, John Malkovich, and more.

Other Accomplishments. Van Ronkel has produced nine films, five of which filmed in Russia, two Russian television series, one for ORT called Tryukachi, and another for Russia Channel 2 called Delo Betagami, three Odessa Jazz Festivals and three 1,000,000 Smiles charity events for orphan children. He has been a consultant to more than 12 film festivals, including the Moscow International Film Festival, Faces of Love, 2Morrow, Astana Action Film Festival, Eurasia International Film Festival, Odessa International Film Festival, Tashkent International Film Festival, Stars of Shaken Film Festival, Me and Family and October, as well as Russian channels MTV, Muz-TV, NTV and the 1st Channel. In 2007 he opened the Grand Havana Room Moscow, a private cigar and business club for Russia's elite [8] and in 2014, opened the Doors to Hollywood Acting Academy in Moscow.

Currently. Van Ronkel is living back in the U.S. and continues to bring well-known celebrities, bands and speakers to Russia, Kazakhstan, and other countries.  In 2018 he took Richard Gere to speak at a forum in Moscow. In 2019 he took Arnold Schwarzenegger to speak at a global forum in Saint Petersburg. He is arranging co-financing for films with Hollywood and Russian film makers and financiers, booking Hollywood celebrities to attend different types of events, including advertising and marketing campaigns for many different Russian companies and developing his own television series for the U.S. that will film in Russia

Production
2022 - Executive Producer, "The Yellow Note"
2017 - Executive Producer, Show Girls TV Series for NTV.
2015 - Executive Producer, The Hangover
2016 - Producer, Irina Nero Music Video I Love You
2014 - Executive Producer, Delo Betagami TV Series Russia 2, 8 Episodes
2011 – Associate Producer, In the Name of the King 2 
2011 - Executive Producer  All Inclusive (Not Credited)
2009 – Co-Produced, Command Performance
2006 – Produced, The Odessa Jazz Festival
2005 – Produced, The Odessa Jazz Festival
2004 – Produced, A Day at the Jazz Festival
2004 – Produced, Odessa Jazz Festival
2004 – Executive Produced, Mirror Wars (Zerkalnie voyni: Otrazhenie pervoye)
2003 – Co-Produced, Tryukachi, a television series about stuntmen for Russia's ORT
2003 – Produced, Hiro Yamagata's Outdoor Laser Exhibition in Saint Petersburg
2001 – Executive Produced, Red Serpent
2000 – Executive Produced, Scream of the Mummy
1999 – Executive Produced, The Tic Code
     – Best feature film; Berlin International Film Festival
     – Audience Award and Special Recognition for Music; Hampton's Int. Film Festival

References

 1. CNN - July, 2018 - https://www.youtube.com/watch?v=Bvv4O0EhiIM

 2. Kyle Swenson (August 8, 2018). "The Putin-Seagal bromance: The backstory". The Washington Post. Retrieved July 15, 2019. - https://www.washingtonpost.com/news/morning-mix/wp/2018/08/08/meet-the-la-dealmaker-who-helped-bring-steven-seagal-and-vladimir-putin-together/

 3. Tim Mak (July 3, 2018). "How Did Steven Seagal And Vladimir Putin Become BFFs? Bob Van Ronkel Introduced Them". NPR. Retrieved July 15, 2019. - https://www.npr.org/2018/07/03/624059365/how-did-steven-seagal-and-vladimir-putin-become-bffs-bob-van-ronkel-introduced-t

 4. Tim Mak (July 2, 2018). "The Man Who Connects Hollywood With Russia's Rich And Powerful". WLRN-FM. Retrieved July 15, 2019.

 5. "Боб Ван Ронкель рассказал, как познакомил Сигала и Путина" (in Russian). Intermedia. July 4, 2018. Retrieved July 15, 2019.

 6. Bridge, Robert (January 30, 2009). "Bob Van Ronkel, Hollywood's Man in Moscow". The Moscow News. Moscow. Archived from the original on August 6, 2009. Retrieved October 10, 2010.

 7. Заруцкая, Наталья (April 15, 2003). "Боб Ван Ронкель берет на буксир российскую киноиндустрию". Деловая Пресса. Moscow, Russia. Альянс Медиа.

 8. "Grand Havana Room Opens Its Russian Doors". Passport - http://www.moscowexpatlife.ru/2014/03/interview-with-bob-van-ronkel-mr-hollywood-in-russia/

External links

http://www.bobvanronkel.ru/bvr#/en/  
https://www.imdb.com/name/nm0887876/

Living people
American film producers
Beverly Hills High School alumni
People from Beverly Hills, California
1964 births